Take Cover is the first extended play by American punk rock/hip hop band the Transplants. It was released on October 13, 2017. The EP features 5 cover songs, a redone version of "Saturday Night" (from Barker's Give the Drummer Some) and a new track "Won't Be Coming Back". Its vinyl version is limited to 1000 copies and released on red vinyl.

Release and promotion 
On February 28, 2014, it was revealed on the band's official Facebook page, that the band had begun writing and recording new material. On April 28, 2015, Travis Barker announced that Transplants are almost finished with the recording of several cover songs. He released a list with song titles including songs by bands like Circle Jerks, Cypress Hill, Minor Threat, Beastie Boys, House of Pain, and Sepultura. On January 19, 2017, Barker confirmed that Transplants will be releasing a covers album.

On June 6, 2017, the band posted "Friday the 13th. October 2017." on their Facebook page, which leads to rumors this might be the date for the release of the announced record. On July 29, 2017, the band announced on their Facebook page that the new record will be released on October 13, 2017. It will be an EP named Take Cover. The announcement was repeated on September 22. On October 6, 2017, Transplants announced the track list for Take Cover.

Track listing 

Notes
 "Seeing Red" is a cover of Minor Threat song from their 1981 EP Minor Threat. 
 "Baggy Trousers" is a cover of Madness song from their 1980 album Absolutely. 
 "Nothing but a Heartache" is a cover of The Flirtations song from their 1969 album Nothing But A Heartache. 
 "Live Fast Die Young" is a cover of Violators song from their 1982 single Summer Of '81. 
 "Gratitude" is a cover of Beastie Boys song from their 1992 album Check Your Head.

Personnel 
 Tim Armstrong – vocals, guitar, producer
 Rob "Skinhead Rob" Aston – vocals, producer, artwork & layout 
 Travis Barker – drums, percussion, producer
 Kevin Bivona – keyboards, bass, guitar, melodica, engineering & mixing
 Gene Grimaldi – mastering
 Kevin Wolff – layout, management
 Mattesyn Wyatt – layout
 Mark Machado – logos

Release history

Charts

References

External links 

2017 debut EPs
Epitaph Records albums
Transplants (band) albums
Albums produced by Travis Barker